Radicicol, also known as monorden, is a natural product that binds to Hsp90 (Heat Shock Protein 90) and alters its function. HSP90 client proteins play important roles in the regulation of the cell cycle, cell growth, cell survival, apoptosis, angiogenesis and oncogenesis.

Biosynthesis 
Biosynthesis of Radicicol has been best studied in Pochonia chlamydosporia, in which the majority of the core structure is produced in vivo through iterative type I polyketide synthases. This structure produced is the earliest intermediate in the radicicol biosynthesis, monocillin II. This intermediate is transformed to radicicol through halogenation and epoxide formation performed by RadH and RadP respectively. These enzymes are coded by the genes Rdc2 and Rdc4 in the pathway, and removing either of these results in a product that has the monocillin II core, but does not have either the epoxide or halogen added.

See also 
 Geldanamycin

References

Further reading
 Review of the chemistry and biology of resorcylic acid lactones, including radicicol.

Epoxides
Macrolides
Halogen-containing natural products
Polyketides
Chloroarenes